Sergei Yuryevich Davydov (born 28 July 1979) is a former Russian professional footballer.

Honours
 Belarusian Premier League top scorer: 2001 (25 goals).

External links
 
 

1979 births
People from Vyazma
Living people
Russian footballers
Association football forwards
Russian expatriate footballers
Expatriate footballers in Belarus
FC Khimki players
FC Neman Grodno players
FC Lada-Tolyatti players
FC Chernomorets Novorossiysk players
Belarusian Premier League players
FC Nosta Novotroitsk players
FC Volga Ulyanovsk players
Sportspeople from Smolensk Oblast